Phosphohydroxypyruvic acid is an organic acid most widely known as an intermediate in the synthesis of serine.

Chemical properties 

Phosphohydroxypyruvic acid is a moderately weak acid.

References

Carboxylic acids
Organophosphates